Garndolbenmaen, known colloquially as Garn, is a village in the county of Gwynedd, Wales. The closest villages are Dolbenmaen and Bryncir. The Papur Bro, the local Welsh language paper, is called Y Ffynnon (The Source/Spring).
The village itself has a population of around 300.

In 1856-7 Evan Jones of Garndolbenmaen built the Ynys-y-Pandy Mill on the nearby Gorseddau Junction and Portmadoc Railway.

Blaen y Cae recording studios are located in the village, where Pep Le Pew's album, Un tro yn y Gorllewin and the last album by Gwyneth Glyn, Wyneb Dros Dro, were recorded. The producer and musician Dyl Mei also lives in Garndolbenmaen.

Approximately 50 pupils attend Ysgol Gynradd Garndolbenmaen, many pupils travel from nearby villages including Pant Glas, Bryncir, Cwm Pennant and Golan. The number of pupils attending the school has remained consistent over the past 20 years.

Many of the old cottages in Garndolbenmaen have been turned into holiday homes.

There is a pub in the village, the Cross Foxes (this is now closed) . However at the turn of the 20th century there were several pubs including the Cross Pipes and Dafarn Faig, this was located on the "lôn gefn" (back road) leading to Bryncir.

The Gwynedd county councillor for the Dolbenmaen ward, Steve Churchman, a member of the Liberal Democrats, is the postmaster and he used to run a small shop (this is now closed).

The magazine Narrow Gauge and Industrial Railway Modelling Review is published by Roy C. Link in Garndolbenmaen

Climate
Garndolbenmaen has an oceanic climate (Köppen: Cfb).

Famous residents 
 Peter Jones (Pedr Fardd) (1775–1845), poet and hymn writer

References 

Villages in Gwynedd
Dolbenmaen